Fairfield Township is one of the eighteen townships of Columbiana County, Ohio, United States, extending into southern Mahoning County. The 2010 census reported 10,556 people living in the township, 9,890 of whom lived in the Columbiana County portion of the township and 4,101 of whom lived in the unincorporated Columbiana County portions of the township.

Geography

Fairfield Township is located in northeastern Columbiana County and southern Mahoning County, where it is largely but not entirely coextensive with the Columbiana city limits. Ohio is the only state that allows a single township to exist in multiple counties.

Fairfield Township borders the following townships:
Beaver Township, Mahoning County - north
Springfield Township, Mahoning County - northeast corner
Unity Township - east
Middleton Township - southeast corner
Elkrun Township - south
Center Township - southwest corner
Salem Township - west
Green Township, Mahoning County - northwest corner

One city and one village are located in Fairfield Township:
The city of Columbiana, in the north
The eastern tip of the village of Leetonia, in the northwest

Name 
It is one of seven Fairfield Townships statewide.

History

The township was organized in 1806.  The first permanent settler was known to be Mathias Lower who emigrated from Westmoreland County, Pennsylvania in 1800.

Government
The township is governed by a three-member board of trustees, who are elected in November of odd-numbered years to a four-year term beginning on the following January 1. Two are elected in the year after the presidential election and one is elected in the year before it. There is also an elected township fiscal officer, who serves a four-year term beginning on April 1 of the year after the election, which is held in November of the year before the presidential election. Vacancies in the fiscal officership or on the board of trustees are filled by the remaining trustees.

Township Trustees
Bob Hum, Chairman
Barry A. Miner, Vice Chairman
John Garwood

Fiscal Officer
Emily Wilms

References

External links
Township website
Columbiana County website

Townships in Columbiana County, Ohio
Townships in Mahoning County, Ohio
1806 establishments in Ohio
Townships in Ohio